The following lists events that happened during 1873 in Chile.

Incumbents
President of Chile: Federico Errázuriz Zañartu

Events

February
27 February - The Biblioteca Santiago Severín is founded.

Births
7 January - Maximiliano Poblete (d. 1946)
24 December - Pedro Dartnell (d. 1944)

Deaths 
 9 June -

References 

 
Years of the 19th century in Chile
Chile